Fruitcake EP is an EP released by Filipino alternative rock band Eraserheads released by BMG Records (Pilipinas), Inc. in 1996 as a promotional material for the launching of their album Fruitcake in December 1996. The album contains three tracks that includes the band's well-known Christmas song "Fruitcake", "Old Fashioned Christmas Carol" and an unplugged version of the song "Christmas Alphabet".

Background

The idea of having an EP being released first was opened after BMG Records ( Pilipinas ) reckoned Dec. 6 as the date of the release of the studio album because it's already too late to push a yuletide set.

Recording

The song "Fruitcake" was recorded in two versions having a different ending. Thus, the "standard" version can be heard on the EP while the "album" version can be heard on the album. "Old Fashioned Christmas Carol" was already recorded as part of the studio album. Both songs were recorded at Tracks Studio.

The last song on the EP was a live performance on NU107 in December 1994 with additional back-up vocals by Bobbit, Robert, Jeng, Dong, Laccay.

Track listing
 "Fruitcake" - 4:35
 "Old Fashioned Christmas Carol" - 4:38
 "Christmas Alphabet" - 2:38

References

1996 debut EPs
Eraserheads albums